The 2016 Dutch Open Grand Prix will be the 17th grand prix's badminton tournament of the 2016 BWF Grand Prix Gold and Grand Prix. The tournament will be held at Topsportcentrum in Almere in the Netherlands 11–16 October 2016 and had a total purse of $55,000.

Men's singles

Seeds

  Ajay Jayaram (final)
  Wang Tzu-wei (champion)
  Pablo Abián (second round)
  Emil Holst (semifinals)
  Anders Antonsen (semifinals)
  Raul Must (quarterfinals)
  Henri Hurskainen (quarterfinals)
  Ygor Coelho de Oliveira (quarterfinals)
  Lucas Claerbout (second round)
  Lucas Corvée (third round)
  Parupalli Kashyap (third round)
  Artem Pochtarov (first round)
  Milan Ludík (third round)
  Thomas Rouxel (third round)
  Edwin Ekiring (first round)
  Marius Myhre (third round)

Finals

Top half

Section 1

Section 2

Section 3

Section 4

Bottom half

Section 5

Section 6

Section 7

Section 8

Women's singles

Seeds

  Beiwen Zhang (champion)
  Hsu Ya-ching (final)
  Liang Xiaoyu (semifinals)
  Beatriz Corrales (semifinals)
  Olga Konon (second round)
  Natalia Koch Rohde (quarterfinals)
  Marija Ulitina (quarterfinals)
  Natalia Perminova (first round)

Finals

Top half

Section 1

Section 2

Bottom half

Section 3

Section 4

Men's doubles

Seeds

  Manu Attri / B. Sumeeth Reddy (first round)
  Lee Jhe-huei / Lee Yang (champion)
  Pranaav Jerry Chopra / Akshay Dewalkar (first round)
  Mathias Christiansen / David Daugaard (final)
  Matijs Dierickx / Freek Golinski (second round)
  Mark Lamsfuß / Marvin Seidel (quarterfinals)
  Raphael Beck / Jones Ralfy Jansen (second round)
  Peter Briggs / Tom Wolfenden (withdrew)

Finals

Top half

Section 1

Section 2

Bottom half

Section 3

Section 4

Women's doubles

Seeds

  Eefje Muskens / Selena Piek (withdrew)
  Gabriela Stoeva / Stefani Stoeva (final)
  Setyana Mapasa / Gronya Somerville (champion)
  Maiken Fruergaard / Sara Thygesen (quarterfinals)

Finals

Top half

Section 1

Section 2

Bottom half

Section 3

Section 4

Mixed doubles

Seeds

  Jacco Arends / Selena Piek (withdrew)
  Sam Magee / Chloe Magee (first round)
  Bastian Kersaudy / Lea Palermo (withdrew)
  Pranaav Jerry Chopra / N. Sikki Reddy (semifinals)
  Mathias Christiansen / Sara Thygesen (champion)
  Mark Lamsfuß / Isabel Herttrich (second round)
  Marvin Seidel / Birgit Michels (semifinals)
  Jones Ralfy Jansen / Franziska Volkmann (first round)

Finals

Top half

Section 1

Section 2

Bottom half

Section 3

Section 4

References

External links
  Tournament schedule | Yonex Dutch Open at www.dutchopen.nl

Dutch Open (badminton)
BWF Grand Prix Gold and Grand Prix
Open Grand Prix
Dutch Open Grand Prix
Sports competitions in Almere